Halgania is a genus of small shrubs in the family Boraginaceae. The genus comprises about 20 species that are endemic to Australia. Halgania is named for Emmanuel Halgan, a vice-admiral in the French Navy.

Features
Halgania species are spreading to erect shrubs or subshrubs up to 1.2 m high. Leaves are simple, alternating along the stem and membranaceous or leathery. The leaf margin is entire or toothed to serrate and often revolute. Herbaceous stems and leaves can be glabrous but also covered with glandular hairs, simple or bifurcating (resembling cleats, "dolabriform") hairs. In some species, the surface is also covered with a viscose layer of exudates.

The flowers have a calyx of five more or less connected sepals. The 5-parted corolla is blue to violet, rarely white and flat or widely cup-shaped, similar to Solanum-flowers. The five stamens have short filaments and long yellow to yellow-violet anthers. They are connected via intertwining hairs to an anther cone. The pollen sacs open into a central channel, through which the style later emerges. Dusty pollen is released through a pore made by beak-like appendage of the anthers through buzz pollination. Fruits are two- or four chambered dry drupes.

Systematics
Halgania is a genus that only occurs in Australia, its sister group is still unknown. There are three clades in the genus. The H. andromedifolia-clade (H. andromedifolia and H. rigida) occurs exclusively in Western Australia and the sepals are often conspicuously inqually sized. The anther appendage is short. Species of the H. anagalloides-clade are the only ones to have dolabriform hairs, and they occur in all states of Australia. Their anther appendage is of variable size. The H. littoralis-clade contains the type species of the genus. Its members have neither dolabriform hairs, nor inqually sized sepals, and always long anther appendages. All species of the H. littoralis-clade occur in Western Australia or Northern Territory. Also four-chambered drupes only occur in this group.

Distribution
Halgania species occur in all states of Australia. They grow in well-drained soils and sand in dry climates, except to the hyper-arid regions of the Nullarbor Plain. The species are also absent from temperate and tropical areas.

Selected species
Halgania anagalloides Endl. 
Halgania andromedifolia Behr & F.Muell. – Lavender halgania, smooth halgania
Halgania argyrophylla Diels  
Halgania bebrana Oldfield & F.Muell.  
Halgania brachrhyncha Peter G.Wilson 
Halgania corymbosa Lindl. 
Halgania cyanea Lindl. – Rough halgania  
Halgania erecta Ewart & B.Rees  
Halgania glabra J.M.Black 
Halgania gustafsenii F.Muell.  
Halgania integerrima Endl.
Halgania lavandulacea Endl. – Blue bush  
Halgania littoralis Gaudich.
Halgania preissiana Lehm.
Halgania rigida S.Moore
Halgania sericiflora Benth.
Halgania solanacea F.Muell.

References

New South Wales Flora online: Halgania
FloraBase: the Western Australian Flora: Halgania
What's Its Name?
Association of Societies for Growing Australian Plants (ASGAP): Halganea cyanea

Ehretioideae
Boraginaceae genera